Follow Me is the second studio album by Finnish pop singer Isac Elliot. Released on 7 November 2014, the album peaked at number six on the Finnish Album Chart.

Singles
Two singles with accompanying music videos were released; "Baby I" was released on 23 June 2014 followed by "Tired of Missing You" on 10 October 2014.

Track listing

Charts

Release history

References

2014 albums
Isac Elliot albums
Sony Music albums